To Grandmother's House is an outdoor wooden sculpture by Patrick Gracewood, installed near the Southeast Park Avenue station in Oak Grove, an unincorporated area neighboring Milwaukie in Clackamas County, Oregon, in the United States. It depicts an older woman holding a rabbit in her arms and was carved from a 75-year-old cedar tree, cut down for construction of the MAX Orange Line, over three years. The sculpture was installed on April 29, 2015.

Description and history
Portland artist Patrick Gracewood's To Grandmother's House is installed near the MAX Orange Line's Southeast Park Avenue MAX Station. Carved from a 75-year-old Atlas cedar tree over three years, the sculpture depicts an older woman holding a rabbit in her arms. Additional materials include paint and weathering steel. It was inspired by a photograph Gracewood took years before of his friend's German grandmother. The sculpture was installed on April 29, 2015 as the last of six artworks commissioned by TriMet near the MAX station, each created from trees cleared for the Orange Line. Engineers set the piece on a cement pedestal, then placed it under a metal "treehouse", or a canopy shaped like a tree. According to Gracewood, To Grandmother's House "honors women and how they often hold communities together".

See also

 2015 in art
 Rabbits and hares in art
 Rebirth (sculpture), proposed public art for the station

References

External links

 
 

2015 establishments in Oregon
2015 sculptures
Oak Grove, Oregon
Outdoor sculptures in Oregon
Rabbits and hares in art
Sculptures of women in Oregon
Sculptures on the MAX Orange Line
Steel sculptures in Oregon
Weathering steel
Wooden sculptures in Oregon